The women's 100 metres event at the 1996 World Junior Championships in Athletics was held in Sydney, Australia, at International Athletic Centre on 21 and 22 August.

Medalists

Results

Final
22 August

Wind: +0.6 m/s

Semifinals
22 August

Semifinal 1
Wind: ?.? m/s

Semifinal 2
Wind: -0.8 m/s

Quarterfinals
21 August

Quarterfinal 1
Wind: -1.8 m/s

Quarterfinal 2
Wind: -1.3 m/s

Quarterfinal 3
Wind: -1.3 m/s

Quarterfinal 4
Wind: -1.1 m/s

Heats
21 August

Heat 1

Heat 2
Wind: +0.9 m/s

Heat 3

Heat 4
Wind: -0.6 m/s

Heat 5

Heat 6

Participation
According to an unofficial count, 45 athletes from 34 countries participated in the event.

References

100 metres
100 metres at the World Athletics U20 Championships